Zidanta II was a king of the Hittites (Middle Kingdom) in the 15th century BC.

Life 
He was probably a nephew of Hantili II and had a wife Yaya. Zidanta made peace through the means of a parity treaty with a ruler named Pilliya, his counterpart in Kizzuwatna. This was the last parity treaty ever signed by a Hittite king to a king of Kizzuwatna.

He was succeeded by Huzziya II although their relation remains unclear.

References

External links
Reign of Zidanta II at Hittites.info

Hittite kings
15th-century BC rulers